The Mallick Bari is an erstwhile Zamindari palace or rajbari located in the district of Paschim Medinipur, West Bengal, India. At present, the rajbari is one of Midnapore's most prominent heritage sites. Constructions commenced under Midnapore's then Zamindar Janmenjay Mallick, several hundred years ago.

History 

Mallick Bari palace was the official residence of the Zamindars of Midnapore, among whom Chowdhury Zamindar Jamini Nath Mallick was the most prominent. It is after the titular surname of the dynastic aristocrats and the palace that the location has been named Mallick Chowk. Among the notable aspects is the family's historic Durga Puja, started almost three centuries back, to avert the Maratha invasion of Bengal under the command of Raghuji Bhonsale, later King of Nagpur in today's Maharashtra. Among the traditions are the practices of firing a cannon at the commencement of the Sandhi Puja to notify the other publicly organised pujas and pandals in the vicinity and Kobi-Ganer Lorai, a form of Bengali folk performance that entailed a verbal duel among opponent poets, patronised by former aristocrats in the Bengal region. Apart from the familial Durga Puja, Jamini Mallick also patronised Chandi Puja in today's East Midnapore region.

Independence Movement 
Active in the political sphere, in 1865, Chowdhuri Babu Janmenjay Mallick Bahadur, along with other prominent individuals like Babu Rajnarayan Basu, Prasanna Chandra Bandyopadhyay and Maulavi Khairat Ali, founded the Midnapore Municipality, under the aegis of then District Magistrate and Collector. Jamini Nath Mallick, later Zamindar and one of the district's wealthiest individuals, was also once reprimanded by the colonial government for his association with revolutionaries and funding several movements. He was convicted, along with Raja Narendralal Khan of the Narajole Raj Estate, in the Midnapore Bomb Conspiracy Case in 1911.

Architecture 
Among the notable architectural standards are the palace, built in the neoclassical style, and the Durga Dalan, constructed in the Do-Chala pattern of the Vaishnavite temples of Bishnupur. Apart from these, there are twelve Shaivite temples dedicated to the Hindu God Shiva at Shibbajar, a Rasmancha, site of the famed Ras Purnima celebrations of the palace, and a few water bodies and canals constructed by Janmenjay Mallick.  In 1878, one of the district's first theatrical performances was held at the Natmandir, constructed in the at-chala style of temple architecture, within the palatial quarters. This was also for the first time that the foot-light technique had come to be used in dramatics. Among the most prominent personalities who advocated for and regularly patronised dramatics were Chowdhuri Kumar Joggeshwar Mallick and Chowdhuri Kumar Jogendranath Mallick, brothers of Chowdhuri Zamindar Jamini Mallick Bahadur. Two of the first dramatic performances - ‘Ramabhishek’ and ‘Pravabati’, were organised by their theatrical association, which also included several Magistrates and Zamindari Rajas, and was patronised by Sir Nilratan Sircar.

Gallery

References 

Palaces in West Bengal
Neoclassical architecture in India
Bengali zamindars